The National Order of Merit is an order of merit awarded for all manner of services to Algeria. It was instituted 2 January 1984 and is quite complex, with three classes of 'Dignity' - each with collar, sash with badge and star - as well as Commander, Officer and Knight grades.

Recipients 
 Sadr
 Ahmed Ben Bella
 Houari Boumédiène (posthumously)
 Rabah Bitat
 Ali Kafi
 Abdelmadjid Tebboune, December 19, 2019
 Abdelkader Bensalah, December 19, 2019
 Ahmed Gaid Salah, December 19, 2019

Athir

Foreign personalities:

 Jean-Luc de Cabrières, French writer, December 3, 2000
 Émile Lahoud, President of the Lebanese Republic, July 23, 2002
 Juan Carlos I, King of Spain, October 2, 2002
 Thomas Klestil, Federal President of the Republic of Austria, June 14, 2003
 Rudolf Schuster, President of the Slovak Republic, June 14, 2003
 Jorge Sampaio, President of the Portuguese Republic, December 2, 2003
 Joaquim Chissano, President of the Republic of Mozambique, December 9, 2004
 Fatima bint Mubarak Al Ketbi, President of the General Union of Women of the State of the United Arab Emirates, March 16, 2005
 Alejandro Toledo, President of the Republic of Peru, May 7, 2005
 Ricardo Lagos, President of the Republic of Chile, May 7, 2005
 Luiz Inácio Lula da Silva, President of the Federative Republic of Brazil, February 7, 2006
 Roh Moo-hyun, President of the Republic of Korea, March 11, 2006
 Mohamed ElBaradei, Egyptian Director of the IAEA, January 7, 2007
 László Sólyom, President of the Republic of Hungary, June 2, 2007
 Hazza bin Zayed bin Sultan Al Nahyan, National Security Advisor to the UAE President, October 17, 2007
 Costa-Gavras, Greek-French film director and screenwriter, 4 November 2018
 Kais Saied, President of Tunisia, February 2, 2020
 Sergio Mattarella, President of Italy, November 6, 2021
Algerian personalities:

 , Mujahideen, July 22, 1992 (posthumously)
 , Trade unionist, February 20, 2006 (posthumously)
 Abdelhak Benhamouda, Trade unionist, February 20, 2006 (posthumously)
 Zinedine Zidane, French footballer, December 11, 2006
 Smaïn Lamari, Major-General, September 11, 2007 (posthumously)
 Warda Al-Jazairia, Singer, the 1 st November 2004
 M'Hamed El Anka, Singer, July 4, 2009 (posthumously)
 Fadhéla Dziria, Singer, July 4, 2009 (posthumously)
 , Writer, July 4, 2009
 Bachir Mentouri, Physician, July 4, 2009

 Achir
 Roger Hanin, French actor, December 3, 2000
 Algeria national football team, Winners of the 2019 Africa Cup of Nations, July 21, 2019

References 

Orders, decorations, and medals of Algeria
Orders of merit
Awards established in 1984
1984 establishments in Algeria